Open source is source code that is made freely available for possible modification and redistribution. Products include permission to use the source code, design documents, or content of the product. The open-source model is a decentralized software development model that encourages open collaboration.
A main principle of open-source software development is peer production, with products such as source code, blueprints, and documentation freely available to the public. The open-source movement in software began as a response to the limitations of proprietary code. The model is used for projects such as in open-source appropriate technology, and open-source drug discovery.

Open source promotes universal access via an open-source or free license to a product's design or blueprint, and universal redistribution of that design or blueprint. Before the phrase open source became widely adopted, developers and producers have used a variety of other terms. Open source gained hold with the rise of the Internet. The open-source software movement arose to clarify copyright, licensing, domain, and consumer issues.

Generally, open source refers to a computer program in which the source code is available to the general public for use or modification from its original design. Code is released under the terms of a software license. Depending on the license terms, others may then download, modify, and publish their version (fork) back to the community. Many large formal institutions have sprung up to support the development of the open-source movement, including the Apache Software Foundation, which supports community projects such as the open-source framework Apache Hadoop and the open-source HTTP server Apache HTTP.

History

The sharing of technical information predates the Internet and the personal computer considerably. For instance, in the early years of automobile development a group of capital monopolists owned the rights to a 2-cycle gasoline-engine patent originally filed by George B. Selden. By controlling this patent, they were able to monopolize the industry and force car manufacturers to adhere to their demands, or risk a lawsuit.

In 1911, independent automaker Henry Ford won a challenge to the Selden patent. The result was that the Selden patent became virtually worthless and a new association (which would eventually become the Motor Vehicle Manufacturers Association) was formed. The new association instituted a cross-licensing agreement among all US automotive manufacturers: although each company would develop technology and file patents, these patents were shared openly and without the exchange of money among all the manufacturers. By the time the US entered World War II, 92 Ford patents and 515 patents from other companies were being shared among these manufacturers, without any exchange of money (or lawsuits).

Early instances of the free sharing of source code include IBM's source releases of its operating systems and other programs in the 1950s and 1960s, and the SHARE user group that formed to facilitate the exchange of software. Beginning in the 1960s, ARPANET researchers used an open "Request for Comments" (RFC) process to encourage feedback in early telecommunication network protocols. This led to the birth of the early Internet in 1969.

The sharing of source code on the Internet began when the Internet was relatively primitive, with software distributed via UUCP, Usenet, IRC, and Gopher. BSD, for example, was first widely distributed by posts to comp.os.linux on the Usenet, which is also where its development was discussed. Linux followed in this model.

Open source as a term
There is an example of "open source," meaning the source code was published, but not free software (purchasing a license was still required for use), in 1996. Other recollection have it in use during the 1980s.

It was later proposed by a group of people in the free software movement who were critical of the political agenda and moral philosophy implied in the term "free software" and sought to reframe the discourse to reflect a more commercially minded position. In addition, the ambiguity of the term "free software" was seen as discouraging business adoption. However, the ambiguity of the word "free" exists primarily in English as it can refer to cost.  The group included Christine Peterson, Todd Anderson, Larry Augustin, Jon Hall, Sam Ockman, Michael Tiemann and Eric S. Raymond. Peterson suggested "open source" at a meeting held at Palo Alto, California, in reaction to Netscape's announcement in January 1998 of a source code release for Navigator. Linus Torvalds gave his support the following day, and Phil Hughes backed the term in Linux Journal. Richard Stallman, the founder of the free software movement, quickly decided against endorsing the term. Netscape released its source code under the Netscape Public License and later under the Mozilla Public License.

Raymond was especially active in the effort to popularize the new term. He made the first public call to the free software community to adopt it in February 1998. Shortly after, he founded The Open Source Initiative in collaboration with Bruce Perens.

The term gained further visibility through an event organized in April 1998 by technology publisher Tim O'Reilly. Originally titled the "Freeware Summit" and later known as the "Open Source Summit," the event was attended by the leaders of many of the most important free and open-source projects, including Linus Torvalds, Larry Wall, Brian Behlendorf, Eric Allman, Guido van Rossum, Michael Tiemann, Paul Vixie, Jamie Zawinski, and Eric Raymond. At that meeting, alternatives to the term "free software" were discussed. Tiemann argued for "sourceware" as a new term, while Raymond argued for "open source." The assembled developers took a vote, and the winner was announced at a press conference the same evening.

"Open source" has never managed to entirely supersede the older term "free software," giving rise to the combined term free and open-source software (FOSS).

Economics

Some economists agree that open-source is an information good or "knowledge good" with original work involving a significant amount of time, money, and effort. The cost of reproducing the work is low enough that additional users may be added at zero or near zero costthis is referred to as the marginal cost of a product. Copyright creates a monopoly so that the price charged to consumers can be significantly higher than the marginal cost of production. This allows the author to recoup the cost of making the original work. Copyright thus creates access costs for consumers who value the work more than the marginal cost but less than the initial production cost. Access costs also pose problems for authors who wish to create a derivative work—such as a copy of a software program modified to fix a bug or add a feature, or a remix of a song—but are unable or unwilling to pay the copyright holder for the right to do so.

Being organized as effectively a "consumers' cooperative", open source eliminates some of the access costs of consumers and creators of derivative works by reducing the restrictions of copyright. Basic economic theory predicts that lower costs would lead to higher consumption and also more frequent creation of derivative works.  Organizations such as Creative Commons host websites where individuals can file for alternative "licenses", or levels of restriction, for their works.
These self-made protections free the general society of the costs of policing copyright infringement.

Others argue that since consumers do not pay for their copies, creators are unable to recoup the initial cost of production and thus have little economic incentive to create in the first place. By this argument, consumers would lose out because some of the goods they would otherwise purchase would not be available. In practice, content producers can choose whether to adopt a proprietary license and charge for copies, or an open license. Some goods which require large amounts of professional research and development, such as the pharmaceutical industry (which depends largely on patents, not copyright for intellectual property protection) are almost exclusively proprietary, although increasingly sophisticated technologies are being developed on open-source principles.

There is evidence that open-source development creates enormous value. For example, in the context of open-source hardware design, digital designs are shared for free and anyone with access to digital manufacturing technologies (e.g. RepRap 3D printers) can replicate the product for the cost of materials. The original sharer may receive feedback and potentially improvements on the original design from the peer production community.

Many open-source projects have a high economic value. According to the Battery Open Source Software Index (BOSS), the ten economically most important open-source projects are:

The rank given is based on the activity regarding projects in online discussions, on GitHub, on search activity in search engines and on the influence on the labour market.

Licensing alternatives

Alternative arrangements have also been shown to result in good creation outside of the proprietary license model. Examples include:

Creation for its own sake – For example, Wikipedia editors add content for recreation. Artists have a drive to create. Both communities benefit from free starting material.
 Voluntary after-the-fact donations – used by shareware, street performers, and public broadcasting in the United States.
 Patron – For example, open-access publishing relies on institutional and government funding of research faculty, who also have a professional incentive to publish for reputation and career advancement. Works of the US government are automatically released into the public domain.
 Freemium – Give away a limited version for free and charge for a premium version (potentially using a dual license).
 Give away the product and charge something related – charge for support of open-source enterprise software, give away music but charge for concert admission.
 Give away work to gain market share – used by artists, in corporate software to spoil a dominant competitor (for example in the browser wars and the Android operating system).
 For own use – Businesses or individual software developers often create software to solve a problem, bearing the full cost of initial creation. They will then open source the solution, and benefit from the improvements others make for their own needs. Communalizing the maintenance burden distributes the cost across more users; free riders can also benefit without undermining the creation process.

Open collaboration 
The open-source model is a decentralized software development model that encourages open collaboration, meaning "any system of innovation or production that relies on goal-oriented yet loosely coordinated participants who interact to create a product (or service) of economic value, which they make available to contributors and noncontributors alike." A main principle of open-source software development is peer production, with products such as source code, blueprints, and documentation freely available to the public. The open-source movement in software began as a response to the limitations of proprietary code. The model is used for projects such as in open-source appropriate technology, and open-source drug discovery.

The open-source model for software development inspired the use of the term to refer to other forms of open collaboration, such as in Internet forums, mailing lists and online communities. Open collaboration is also thought to be the operating principle underlining a gamut of diverse ventures, including TEDx and Wikipedia.

Open collaboration is the principle underlying peer production, mass collaboration, and wikinomics. It was observed initially in open-source software, but can also be found in many other instances, such as in Internet forums, mailing lists, Internet communities, and many instances of open content, such as Creative Commons. It also explains some instances of crowdsourcing, collaborative consumption, and open innovation.

Riehle et al. define open collaboration as collaboration based on three principles of egalitarianism, meritocracy, and self-organization. Levine and Prietula define open collaboration as "any system of innovation or production that relies on goal-oriented yet loosely coordinated participants who interact to create a product (or service) of economic value, which they make available to contributors and noncontributors alike." This definition captures multiple instances, all joined by similar principles. For example, all of the elements – goods of economic value, open access to contribute and consume, interaction and exchange, purposeful yet loosely coordinated work – are present in an open-source software project, in Wikipedia, or in a user forum or community. They can also be present in a commercial website that is based on user-generated content. In all of these instances of open collaboration, anyone can contribute and anyone can freely partake in the fruits of sharing, which are produced by interacting participants who are loosely coordinated.

An annual conference dedicated to the research and practice of open collaboration is the International Symposium on Wikis and Open Collaboration (OpenSym, formerly WikiSym). As per its website, the group defines open collaboration as "collaboration that is egalitarian (everyone can join, no principled or artificial barriers to participation exist), meritocratic (decisions and status are merit-based rather than imposed) and self-organizing (processes adapt to people rather than people adapt to pre-defined processes)."

Open-source license 

Open source promotes universal access via an open-source or free license to a product's design or blueprint, and universal redistribution of that design or blueprint. Before the phrase open source became widely adopted, developers and producers used a variety of other terms. Open source gained hold in part due to the rise of the Internet. The open-source software movement arose to clarify copyright, licensing, domain, and consumer issues.

An open-source license is a type of license for computer software and other products that allows the source code, blueprint or design to be used, modified or shared (with or without modification) under defined terms and conditions. This allows end users and commercial companies to review and modify the source code, blueprint or design for their own customization, curiosity or troubleshooting needs. Open-source licensed software is mostly available free of charge, though this does not necessarily have to be the case. Licenses which only permit non-commercial redistribution or modification of the source code for personal use only are generally not considered as open-source licenses. However, open-source licenses may have some restrictions, particularly regarding the expression of respect to the origin of software, such as a requirement to preserve the name of the authors and a copyright statement within the code, or a requirement to redistribute the licensed software only under the same license (as in a copyleft license). One popular set of open-source software licenses are those approved by the Open Source Initiative (OSI) based on their Open Source Definition (OSD).

Applications

Social and political views have been affected by the growth of the concept of open source. Advocates in one field often support the expansion of open source in other fields. But Eric Raymond and other founders of the open-source movement have sometimes publicly argued against speculation about applications outside software, saying that strong arguments for software openness should not be weakened by overreaching into areas where the story may be less compelling. The broader impact of the open-source movement, and the extent of its role in the development of new information sharing procedures, remain to be seen.

The open-source movement has inspired increased transparency and liberty in biotechnology research, for example CAMBIA Even the research methodologies themselves can benefit from the application of open-source principles. It has also given rise to the rapidly-expanding open-source hardware movement.

Computer software

Open-source software is software which source code is published and made available to the public, enabling anyone to copy, modify and redistribute the source code without paying royalties or fees.

LibreOffice and the GNU Image Manipulation Program are examples of open source software. As they do with proprietary software, users must accept the terms of a license when they use open source software—but the legal terms of open source licenses differ dramatically from those of proprietary licenses.

Open-source code can evolve through community cooperation. These communities are composed of individual programmers as well as large companies. Some of the individual programmers who start an open-source project may end up establishing companies offering products or services incorporating open-source programs. Examples of open-source software products are:
Linux (that much of world's server parks are running)
MediaWiki (that Wikipedia is based upon)
 Many more:
 List of free and open-source software packages
 List of formerly proprietary software

Electronics

Open-source hardware is hardware which initial specification, usually in a software format, is published and made available to the public, enabling anyone to copy, modify and redistribute the hardware and source code without paying royalties or fees. Open-source hardware evolves through community cooperation. These communities are composed of individual hardware/software developers, hobbyists, as well as very large companies. Examples of open-source hardware initiatives are:
 Openmoko: a family of open-source mobile phones, including the hardware specification and the operating system.
 OpenRISC: an open-source microprocessor family, with architecture specification licensed under GNU GPL and implementation under LGPL.
 Sun Microsystems's OpenSPARC T1 Multicore processor. Sun has released it under GPL.
 Arduino, a microcontroller platform for hobbyists, artists and designers.
 Simputer, an open hardware handheld computer, designed in India for use in environments where computing devices such as personal computers are deemed inappropriate.
 LEON: A family of open-source microprocessors distributed in a library with peripheral IP cores, open SPARC V8 specification, implementation available under GNU GPL.
 Tinkerforge: A system of open-source stackable microcontroller building blocks. Allows control of motors and read out sensors with the programming languages C, C++, C#, Object Pascal, Java, PHP, Python and Ruby over a USB or Wifi connection on Windows, Linux and Mac OS X. All of the hardware is licensed under CERN OHL (CERN Open Hardware License).
 Open Compute Project: designs for computer data center including power supply, Intel motherboard, AMD motherboard, chassis, racks, battery cabinet, and aspects of electrical and mechanical design.

Food and beverages

Some publishers of open-access journals have argued that data from food science and gastronomy studies should be freely available to aid reproducibility. A number of people have published creative commons licensed recipe books.

 Open-source colas – cola soft drinks, similar to Coca-Cola and Pepsi, whose recipe is open source and developed by volunteers. The taste is said to be comparable to that of the standard beverages. Most corporations producing beverages hold their formulas as closely guarded secrets.
 Free Beer (originally Vores Øl) – is an open-source beer created by students at the IT-University in Copenhagen together with Superflex, an artist collective, to illustrate how open-source concepts might be applied outside the digital world.

Digital content

 Open-content projects organized by the Wikimedia Foundation – Sites such as Wikipedia and Wiktionary have embraced the open-content Creative Commons content licenses. These licenses were designed to adhere to principles similar to various open-source software development licenses. Many of these licenses ensure that content remains free for re-use, that source documents are made readily available to interested parties, and that changes to content are accepted easily back into the system. Important sites embracing open-source-like ideals are Project Gutenberg and Wikisource, both of which post many books on which the copyright has expired and are thus in the public domain, ensuring that anyone has free, unlimited access to that content.
 Open ICEcat is an open catalog for the IT, CE and Lighting sectors with product data-sheets based on Open Content License agreement. The digital content are distributed in XML and URL formats.
Google Sketchup's 3D Warehouse is an open-source design community centered around the use of proprietary software that's distributed free of charge.
 The University of Waterloo Stratford Campus invites students every year to use its three-storey Christie MicroTiles wall as a digital canvas for their creative work.

Medicine
 Pharmaceuticals – There have been several proposals for open-source pharmaceutical development, which led to the establishment of the Tropical Disease Initiative and the Open Source Drug Discovery for Malaria Consortium.
 Genomics – The term "open-source genomics" refers to the combination of rapid release of sequence data (especially raw reads) and crowdsourced analyses from bioinformaticians around the world that characterised the analysis of the 2011 E. coli O104:H4 outbreak.
 OpenEMR – OpenEMR is an ONC-ATB Ambulatory EHR 2011-2012 certified electronic health records and medical practice management application. It features fully integrated electronic health, records, practice management, scheduling, electronic billing, and is the base for many EHR programs.

Science and engineering

 Research – The Science Commons was created as an alternative to the expensive legal costs of sharing and reusing scientific works in journals etc.
 Research – The Open Solar Outdoors Test Field (OSOTF) is a grid-connected photovoltaic test system, which continuously monitors the output of a number of photovoltaic modules and correlates their performance to a long list of highly accurate meteorological readings. The OSOTF is organized under open-source principles – All data and analysis is to be made freely available to the entire photovoltaic community and the general public.
 Engineering – Hyperloop, a form of high-speed transport proposed by entrepreneur Elon Musk, which he describes as "an elevated, reduced-pressure tube that contains pressurized capsules driven within the tube by a number of linear electric motors".
 Construction – WikiHouse is an open-source project for designing and building houses.
 Energy research – The Open Energy Modelling Initiative promotes open-source models and open data in energy research and policy advice.

Robotics

An open-source robot is a robot whose blueprints, schematics, or source code are released under an open-source model

Other

 Open-source principles can be applied to technical areas such as digital communication protocols and data storage formats.
 Open-design – which involves applying open-source methodologies to the design of artifacts and systems in the physical world. It is very nascent but has huge potential.
 Open-source appropriate technology (OSAT) refers to technologies that are designed in the same fashion as free and open-source software. These technologies must be "appropriate technology" (AT) – meaning technology that is designed with special consideration to the environmental, ethical, cultural, social, political, and economic aspects of the community it is intended for. An example of this application is the use of open-source 3D printers like the RepRap to manufacture appropriate technology.
 Teaching – which involves applying the concepts of open source to instruction using a shared web space as a platform to improve upon learning, organizational, and management challenges. An example of an Open-source courseware is the Java Education & Development Initiative (JEDI). Other examples include Khan Academy and wikiversity. At the university level, the use of open-source-appropriate technology classroom projects has been shown to be successful in forging the connection between science/engineering and social benefit: This approach has the potential to use university students' access to resources and testing equipment in furthering the development of appropriate technology. Similarly OSAT has been used as a tool for improving service learning.
 There are few examples of business information (methodologies, advice, guidance, practices) using the open-source model, although this is another case where the potential is enormous. ITIL is close to open source. It uses the Cathedral model (no mechanism exists for user contribution) and the content must be bought for a fee that is small by business consulting standards (hundreds of British pounds). Various checklists are published by government, banks or accounting firms.
 An open-source group emerged in 2012 that is attempting to design a firearm that may be downloaded from the internet and "printed" on a 3D Printer. Calling itself Defense Distributed, the group wants to facilitate "a working plastic gun that could be downloaded and reproduced by anybody with a 3D printer".
 Agrecol, a German NGO has developed an open-source licence for seeds operating with copyleft and created OpenSourceSeeds as a respective service provider. Breeders that apply the license to their new invented material prevent it from the threat of privatisation and help to establish a commons-based breeding sector as an alternative to the commercial sector.
 Open Source Ecology, farm equipment and global village construction kit.

"Open" versus "free" versus "free and open" 
Free and open-source software (FOSS) or free/libre and open-source software (FLOSS) is openly shared source code that is licensed without any restrictions on usage, modification, or distribution. Confusion persists about this definition because the "free", also known as "libre", refers to the freedom of the product, not the price, expense, cost, or charge. For example, "being free to speak" is not the same as "free beer".

Conversely, Richard Stallman argues the "obvious meaning" of term "open source" is that the source code is public/accessible for inspection, without necessarily any other rights granted, although the proponents of the term say the conditions in the Open Source Definition must be fulfilled.

"Free and open" should not be confused with public ownership (state ownership), deprivatization (nationalization), anti-privatization (anti-corporate activism), or transparent behavior.
 GNU
 GNU Manifesto
 Richard Stallman
 Gratis versus libre (no cost vs no restriction)

Software 

Generally, open source refers to a computer program in which the source code is available to the general public for use for any (including commercial) purpose, or modification from its original design. Open-source code is meant to be a collaborative effort, where programmers improve upon the source code and share the changes within the community. Code is released under the terms of a software license. Depending on the license terms, others may then download, modify, and publish their version (fork) back to the community.

 List of free and open-source software packages
 Open-source license, a copyright license that makes the source code available with a product
 The Open Source Definition, as used by the Open Source Initiative for open source software
 Open-source model, a decentralized software development model that encourages open collaboration
 Open-source software, software which permits the use and modification of its source code
 History of free and open-source software
 Open-source software advocacy
 Open-source software development
 Open-source-software movement
 Open-source video games
 List of open-source video games
 Business models for open-source software
 Comparison of open-source and closed-source software
 Diversity in open-source software
 MapGuide Open Source, a web-based map-making platform to develop and deploy web mapping applications and geospatial web services (not to be confused with OpenStreetMap (OSM), a collaborative project to create a free editable map of the world).

Agriculture, economy, manufacturing and production 
 Open-source appropriate technology (OSAT), is designed for environmental, ethical, cultural, social, political, economic, and community aspects
 Open-design movement, development of physical products, machines and systems via publicly shared design information, including free and open-source software and open-source hardware, among many others:
 Open Architecture Network, improving global living conditions through innovative sustainable design
 OpenCores, a community developing digital electronic open-source hardware
 Open Design Alliance, develops Teigha, a software development platform to create engineering applications including CAD software
 Open Hardware and Design Alliance (OHANDA), sharing open hardware and designs via free online services
 Open Source Ecology (OSE), a network of farmers, engineers, architects and supporters striving to manufacture the Global Village Construction Set (GVCS)
 OpenStructures (OSP), a modular construction model where everyone designs on the basis of one shared geometrical OS grid
 Open manufacturing or "Open Production" or "Design Global, Manufacture Local", a new socioeconomic production model to openly and collaboratively produce and distribute physical objects
 Open-source architecture (OSArc), emerging procedures in imagination and formation of virtual and real spaces within an inclusive universal infrastructure
 Open-source cola, cola soft drinks made to open-sourced recipes
 Open-source hardware, or open hardware, computer hardware, such as microprocessors, that is designed in the same fashion as open source software
 List of open-source hardware projects
 Open-source product development (OSPD), collaborative product and process openness of open-source hardware for any interested participants
 Open-source robotics, physical artifacts of the subject are offered by the open design movement
 Open Source Seed Initiative, open source varieties of crop seeds, as an alternative to patent-protected seeds sold by large agriculture companies.

Science and medicine 
 Open science, the movement to make scientific research, data and dissemination accessible to all levels of an inquiring society, amateur or professional
 Open science data, a type of open data focused on publishing observations and results of scientific activities available for anyone to analyze and reuse
 Open Science Framework and the Center for Open Science
 Open Source Lab (disambiguation), several laboratories
 Open-Source Lab (book), a 2014 book by Joshua M. Pearce
 Open-notebook science, the practice of making the entire primary record of a research project publicly available online as it is recorded
 Open Source Physics (OSP), a National Science Foundation and Davidson College project to spread the use of open source code libraries that take care of much of the heavy lifting for physics
 Open Source Geospatial Foundation
 NASA Open Source Agreement (NOSA), an OSI-approved software license
 List of open-source software for mathematics
 List of open-source bioinformatics software
 List of open-source health software
 List of open-source health hardware

Media 
 Open-source film, open source movies
 List of open-source films
 Open Source Cinema, a collaborative website to produce a documentary film
 Open-source journalism, commonly describes a spectrum on online publications, forms of innovative publishing of online journalism, and content voting, rather than the sourcing of news stories by "professional" journalists
 Open-source investigation
 See also: Crowdsourcing, crowdsourced journalism, crowdsourced investigation, trutherism, and historical revisionism considered "fringe" by corporate media.
 Open-source record label, open source music
 "Open Source", a 1960s rock song performed by The Magic Mushrooms
 Open Source (radio show), a radio show using open content information gathering methods hosted by Christopher Lydon
 Open textbook, an open copyright licensed textbook made freely available online for students, teachers, and the public

Organizations 
 Open Source Initiative (OSI), an organization dedicated to promote open source
 Open Source Software Institute
 Journal of Open Source Software
 Open Source Day, the dated varies from year to year for an international conference for fans of open solutions from Central and Eastern Europe
 Open Source Developers' Conference
 Open Source Development Labs (OSDL), a non-profit corporation that provides space for open-source project
 Open Source Drug Discovery, a collaborative drug discovery platform for neglected tropical diseases
 Open Source Technology Group (OSTG), news, forums, and other SourceForge resources for IT
 Open source in Kosovo
 Open Source University Meetup
 New Zealand Open Source Awards

Procedures 
 Open security, application of open source philosophies to computer security
 Open Source Information System, the former name of an American unclassified network serving the U.S. intelligence community with open-source intelligence, since mid-2006 the content of OSIS is now known as Intelink-U while the network portion is known as DNI-U
 Open-source intelligence, an intelligence gathering discipline based on information collected from open sources (not to be confused with open-source artificial intelligence such as Mycroft (software)).

Society 
The rise of open-source culture in the 20th century resulted from a growing tension between creative practices that involve require access to content that is often copyrighted, and restrictive intellectual property laws and policies governing access to copyrighted content. The two main ways in which intellectual property laws became more restrictive in the 20th century were extensions to the term of copyright (particularly in the United States) and penalties, such as those articulated in the Digital Millennium Copyright Act (DMCA), placed on attempts to circumvent anti-piracy technologies.

Although artistic appropriation is often permitted under fair-use doctrines, the complexity and ambiguity of these doctrines creates an atmosphere of uncertainty among cultural practitioners. Also, the protective actions of copyright owners create what some call a "chilling effect" among cultural practitioners.

The idea of an "open-source" culture runs parallel to "Free Culture," but is substantively different. Free culture is a term derived from the free software movement, and in contrast to that vision of culture, proponents of open-source culture (OSC) maintain that some intellectual property law needs to exist to protect cultural producers. Yet they propose a more nuanced position than corporations have traditionally sought. Instead of seeing intellectual property law as an expression of instrumental rules intended to uphold either natural rights or desirable outcomes, an argument for OSC takes into account diverse goods (as in "the Good life") and ends.

Sites such as ccMixter offer up free web space for anyone willing to license their work under a Creative Commons license. The resulting cultural product is then available to download free (generally accessible) to anyone with an Internet connection. Older, analog technologies such as the telephone or television have limitations on the kind of interaction users can have.

Through various technologies such as peer-to-peer networks and blogs, cultural producers can take advantage of vast social networks to distribute their products. As opposed to traditional media distribution, redistributing digital media on the Internet can be virtually costless. Technologies such as BitTorrent and Gnutella take advantage of various characteristics of the Internet protocol (TCP/IP) in an attempt to totally decentralize file distribution.

Government
 Open politics (sometimes known as Open-source politics) is a political process that uses Internet technologies such as blogs, email and polling to provide for a rapid feedback mechanism between political organizations and their supporters. There is also an alternative conception of the term Open-source politics which relates to the development of public policy under a set of rules and processes similar to the open-source software movement.
 Open-source governance is similar to open-source politics, but it applies more to the democratic process and promotes the freedom of information.
 Open-source political campaigns refer specifically to political campaigns.
 The South Korean government wants to increase its use of free and open-source software, to decrease its dependence on proprietary software solutions. It plans to make open standards a requirement, to allow the government to choose between multiple operating systems and web browsers. Korea's Ministry of Science, ICT & Future Planning is also preparing ten pilots on using open-source software distributions.

Ethics
Open-source ethics is split into two strands:
 Open-source ethics as an ethical school – Charles Ess and David Berry are researching whether ethics can learn anything from an open-source approach. Ess famously even defined the AoIR Research Guidelines as an example of open-source ethics.
 Open-source ethics as a professional body of rules – This is based principally on the computer ethics school, studying the questions of ethics and professionalism in the computer industry in general and software development in particular.

Religion

Irish philosopher Richard Kearney has used the term "open-source Hinduism" to refer to the way historical figures such as Mohandas Gandhi and Swami Vivekananda worked upon this ancient tradition.

Media
Open-source journalism formerly referred to the standard journalistic techniques of news gathering and fact checking, reflecting open-source intelligence, a similar term used in military intelligence circles. Now, open-source journalism commonly refers to forms of innovative publishing of online journalism, rather than the sourcing of news stories by a professional journalist. In the 25 December 2006 issue of TIME magazine this is referred to as user created content and listed alongside more traditional open-source projects such as OpenSolaris and Linux.

Weblogs, or blogs, are another significant platform for open-source culture. Blogs consist of periodic, reverse chronologically ordered posts, using a technology that makes webpages easily updatable with no understanding of design, code, or file transfer required. While corporations, political campaigns and other formal institutions have begun using these tools to distribute information, many blogs are used by individuals for personal expression, political organizing, and socializing. Some, such as LiveJournal or WordPress, use open-source software that is open to the public and can be modified by users to fit their own tastes. Whether the code is open or not, this format represents a nimble tool for people to borrow and re-present culture; whereas traditional websites made the illegal reproduction of culture difficult to regulate, the mutability of blogs makes "open sourcing" even more uncontrollable since it allows a larger portion of the population to replicate material more quickly in the public sphere.

Messageboards are another platform for open-source culture. Messageboards (also known as discussion boards or forums), are places online where people with similar interests can congregate and post messages for the community to read and respond to. Messageboards sometimes have moderators who enforce community standards of etiquette such as banning spammers. Other common board features are private messages (where users can send messages to one another) as well as chat (a way to have a real time conversation online) and image uploading. Some messageboards use phpBB, which is a free open-source package. Where blogs are more about individual expression and tend to revolve around their authors, messageboards are about creating a conversation amongst its users where information can be shared freely and quickly. Messageboards are a way to remove intermediaries from everyday life—for instance, instead of relying on commercials and other forms of advertising, one can ask other users for frank reviews of a product, movie or CD. By removing the cultural middlemen, messageboards help speed the flow of information and exchange of ideas.

OpenDocument is an open document file format for saving and exchanging editable office documents such as text documents (including memos, reports, and books), spreadsheets, charts, and presentations. Organizations and individuals that store their data in an open format such as OpenDocument avoid being locked into a single software vendor, leaving them free to switch software if their current vendor goes out of business, raises their prices, changes their software, or changes their licensing terms to something less favorable.

Open-source movie production is either an open call system in which a changing crew and cast collaborate in movie production, a system in which the result is made available for re-use by others or in which exclusively open-source products are used in the production. The 2006 movie Elephants Dream is said to be the "world's first open movie", created entirely using open-source technology.

An open-source documentary film has a production process allowing the open contributions of archival material footage, and other filmic elements, both in unedited and edited form, similar to crowdsourcing. By doing so, on-line contributors become part of the process of creating the film, helping to influence the editorial and visual material to be used in the documentary, as well as its thematic development. The first open-source documentary film is the non-profit WBCN and the American Revolution, which went into development in 2006, and will examine the role media played in the cultural, social and political changes from 1968 to 1974 through the story of radio station WBCN-FM in Boston. The film is being produced by Lichtenstein Creative Media and the non-profit Center for Independent Documentary.  Open Source Cinema is a website to create Basement Tapes, a feature documentary about copyright in the digital age, co-produced by the National Film Board of Canada.
Open-source film-making refers to a form of film-making that takes a method of idea formation from open-source software, but in this case the 'source' for a filmmaker is raw unedited footage rather than programming code. It can also refer to a method of film-making where the process of creation is 'open' i.e. a disparate group of contributors, at different times contribute to the final piece.

Open-IPTV is IPTV that is not limited to one recording studio, production studio, or cast. Open-IPTV uses the Internet or other means to pool efforts and resources together to create an online community that all contributes to a show.

Education

Within the academic community, there is discussion about expanding what could be called the "intellectual commons" (analogous to the Creative Commons). Proponents of this view have hailed the Connexions Project at Rice University, OpenCourseWare project at MIT, Eugene Thacker's article on "open-source DNA", the "Open Source Cultural Database", Salman Khan's Khan Academy and Wikipedia as examples of applying open source outside the realm of computer software.

Open-source curricula are instructional resources whose digital source can be freely used, distributed and modified. Another strand to the academic community is in the area of research. Many funded research projects produce software as part of their work. Due to the benefits of sharing software openly in scientific endeavours, there is an increasing interest in making the outputs of research projects available under an open-source license. In the UK the Joint Information Systems Committee (JISC) has developed a policy on open-source software. JISC also funds a development service called OSS Watch which acts as an advisory service for higher and further education institutions wishing to use, contribute to and develop open-source software.

On 30 March 2010, President Barack Obama signed the Health Care and Education Reconciliation Act, which included $2 billion over four years to fund the TAACCCT program, which is described as "the largest OER (open education resources) initiative in the world and uniquely focused on creating curricula in partnership with industry for credentials in vocational industry sectors like manufacturing, health, energy, transportation, and IT".

Innovation communities
The principle of sharing pre-dates the open-source movement; for example, the free sharing of information has been institutionalized in the scientific enterprise since at least the 19th century. Open-source principles have always been part of the scientific community. The sociologist Robert K. Merton described the four basic elements of the community—universalism (an international perspective), communalism (sharing information), objectivity (removing one's personal views from the scientific inquiry) and organized skepticism (requirements of proof and review) that describe the (idealised) scientific community.

These principles are, in part, complemented by US law's focus on protecting expression and method but not the ideas themselves. There is also a tradition of publishing research results to the scientific community instead of keeping all such knowledge proprietary. One of the recent initiatives in scientific publishing has been open access—the idea that research should be published in such a way that it is free and available to the public. There are currently many open access journals where the information is available free online, however most journals do charge a fee (either to users or libraries for access). The Budapest Open Access Initiative is an international effort with the goal of making all research articles available free on the Internet.

The National Institutes of Health has recently proposed a policy on "Enhanced Public Access to NIH Research Information". This policy would provide a free, searchable resource of NIH-funded results to the public and with other international repositories six months after its initial publication. The NIH's move is an important one because there is significant amount of public funding in scientific research. Many of the questions have yet to be answered—the balancing of profit vs. public access, and ensuring that desirable standards and incentives do not diminish with a shift to open access.

Benjamin Franklin was an early contributor eventually donating all his inventions including the Franklin stove, bifocals, and the lightning rod to the public domain. New NGO communities are starting to use the open-source technology as a tool. One example is the Open Source Youth Network started in 2007 in Lisboa by ISCA members. Open innovation is also a new emerging concept which advocate putting R&D in a common pool. The Eclipse platform is openly presenting itself as an Open innovation network.

Arts and recreation
Copyright protection is used in the performing arts and even in athletic activities. Some groups have attempted to remove copyright from such practices.

In 2012, Russian music composer, scientist and Russian Pirate Party member Victor Argonov presented detailed raw files of his electronic opera "2032" under free license CC-BY-NC 3.0 (later relicensed under CC-BY-SA 4.0). This opera was originally composed and published in 2007 by Russian label MC Entertainment as a commercial product, but then the author changed its status to free. In his blog he said that he decided to open raw files (including wav, midi and other used formats) to the public to support worldwide pirate actions against SOPA and PIPA. Several Internet resources called "2032" the first open-source musical opera in history.

Other related movements

Notable events and applications that have been developed via the open source community, and echo the ideologies of the open source movement, include the Open Education Consortium, Project Gutenberg, Synthethic Biology, and Wikipedia. The Open Education Consortium is an organization composed of various colleges that support open source and share some of their material online. This organization, headed by Massachusetts Institute of Technology, was established to aid in the exchange of open source educational materials. Wikipedia is a user-generated online encyclopedia with sister projects in academic areas, such as Wikiversity—a community dedicated to the creation and exchange of learning materials.

Prior to the existence of Google Scholar Beta, Project Gutenberg was the first supplier of electronic books and the first free library project. Synthetic Biology is a new technology that promises to enable cheap, lifesaving new drugs, as well as helping to yield biofuels that may help to solve our energy problem. Although synthetic biology has not yet come out of its lab stage, it has potential to become industrialized in the near future. To industrialize open source science, there are some scientists who are trying to build their own brand of it.

Ideologically-related movements
The open-access movement is a movement that is similar in ideology to the open source movement. Members of this movement maintain that academic material should be readily available to provide help with "future research, assist in teaching and aid in academic purposes." The open-access movement aims to eliminate subscription fees and licensing restrictions of academic materials. The free-culture movement is a movement that seeks to achieve a culture that engages in collective freedom via freedom of expression, free public access to knowledge and information, full demonstration of creativity and innovation in various arenas, and promotion of citizen liberties. Creative Commons is an organization that "develops, supports, and stewards legal and technical infrastructure that maximizes digital creativity, sharing, and innovation." It encourages the use of protected properties online for research, education, and creative purposes in pursuit of a universal access. Creative Commons provides an infrastructure through a set of copyright licenses and tools that creates a better balance within the realm of "all rights reserved" properties. The Creative Commons license offers a slightly more lenient alternative to "all rights reserved" copyrights for those who do not wish to exclude the use of their material.

The Zeitgeist Movement (TZM) is an international social movement that advocates a transition into a sustainable "resource-based economy" based on collaboration in which monetary incentives are replaced by commons-based ones with everyone having access to everything (from code to products) as in "open source everything". While its activism and events are typically focused on media and education, TZM is a major supporter of open source projects worldwide since they allow for uninhibited advancement of science and technology, independent of constraints posed by institutions of patenting and capitalist investment. P2P Foundation is an "international organization focused on studying, researching, documenting and promoting peer to peer practices in a very broad sense." Its objectives incorporate those of the open source movement, whose principles are integrated in a larger socio-economic model.

See also

 Access to Knowledge movement (A2K)
 Cooperative
 Decentralization
 Decentralized computing
 Distributed data storage
 Distributed file systems
 Internet privacy
 Privacy software
 Free Beer
 Free-culture movement
 Free Knowledge Foundation
 Freedom of contract
 OpenBTS
 Open Compute Project
 Open Data Institute
 Open education
 Open educational resources
 Open format
 Open Knowledge International
 Open copyright license
 Open publishing
 Open research
 Open-source curriculum (OSC)
 Open-source governance
 Open politics
 Open-source religion
 Open-source unionism
 Open standard
 Paywall
 Peer-to-peer
 Radical transparency
 Sharing economy
 Social collaboration
 Solidarity economy
 Tactical Technology Collective
 Voluntary association
 Voluntaryism or Agorism

Terms based on open source
 Open implementation
 Open security
 Open-source record label
 Open standard
 Shared Source
 Source-available software

Other
 Open Sources: Voices from the Open Source Revolution (book)
 Commons-based peer production
 Digital rights
 Diseconomies of scale
 Free content
 Gift economy
 Glossary of legal terms in technology
 Mass collaboration
 Network effect
 Open Source Initiative
 Openness
 Proprietary software

References

Further reading
 
 
 Karl Fogel. Producing Open Source Software (How to run a successful free-software project). Free PDF version available.
 
 
 (wiki)
 Nettingsmeier, Jörn. "So What? I Don't Hack!" eContact! 11.3Logiciels audio " open source " / Open Source for Audio Application (September 2009). Montréal: CEC.
 
 
 Various authors. eContact! 11.3Logiciels audio " open source " / Open Source for Audio Application (September 2009). Montréal: CEC.
 Various authors. "Open Source Travel Guide [wiki]". eContact! 11.3Logiciels audio " open source " / Open Source for Audio Application (September 2009). Montréal: CEC.

Literature on legal and economic aspects
 
 
 
 
 v. Engelhardt, S. (2008): "Intellectual Property Rights and Ex-Post Transaction Costs: the Case of Open and Closed Source Software", Jena Economic Research Papers 2008-047. (PDF)
 v. Engelhardt, S. (2008): "Intellectual Property Rights and Ex-Post Transaction Costs: the Case of Open and Closed Source Software", Jena Economic Research Papers 2008-047. (PDF)
 
 
 European Commission. (2006). Economic impact of open source software on innovation and the competitiveness of the Information and Communication Technologies sector in the EU. Brussels.
 
 (wiki)
 
  earlier revision (PDF)
 
 
 
 
 
 
 
  earlier revision

External links

 
Academic publishing
Business models
Collaborative software
Computer law
Data publishing
Free culture movement
Intellectual property law
Open access (publishing)
Open content projects
Open educational resources
Open formats
Open hardware electronic devices
Open hardware organizations and companies
Open science
 
Open-source movement
Scholarly communication
Articles containing video clips